Propaganda: The Art of Selling Lies is a 2019 Canadian documentary film, directed by Larry Weinstein. The film examines the nature and history of propaganda, particularly the use of visual art to promote both positive and negative social messaging.

The film premiered at the 2019 Hot Docs Canadian International Documentary Festival. David New received a Canadian Screen Award nomination for Best Editing in a Documentary at the 8th Canadian Screen Awards in 2020.

References

External links
 
 

2019 films
2019 documentary films
Canadian documentary films
2010s English-language films
2010s Canadian films